Eh ( or ) is a spoken interjection used in many varieties of English that is similar in meaning to "Excuse me?", "Please repeat that", or "Huh?". It is also commonly used as an alternative to the question tag right?, i.e., method for inciting a reply, as in "Don't you think?", "You agree with me, right?", as in, "It's nice here, eh?" (instead of "It's nice here, right?"). In the Americas, it is most commonly associated with Canada and Canadian English, though it is also common in England, Scotland, and New Zealand. It is also known in some American regions bordering Canada, including the area stretching from northern Wisconsin up to Michigan's Upper Peninsula. Similar interjections exist in many other languages, such as Azerbaijani and Italian.

The spelling of this sound in English is quite different from the common usage of these letters. The vowel is sounded in one of the continental manners (as in French, only missing the apostrophe), and the letter h is used to indicate it is long, as though the origin of the spelling were German.

It is an invariant question tag, unlike the "is it?" and "have you?" tags that have, with the insertion of not, different construction in positive and negative questions.

English

United States
"Eh" is also used in situations to describe something bad or mediocre, in which case it is often pronounced with a short "e" sound and the "h" may even be noticeable. 

Many Italian Americans, especially in the New York area, use the term "eh" as a general substitute for such basic greetings, such as "hey" or "hello".

Canada
According to the Canadian Oxford Dictionary, a usage of eh that is distinct to Canada and some regions of Michigan's Upper Peninsula, northern Wisconsin, and northern Minnesota, is for "ascertaining the comprehension, continued interest, agreement, etc., of the person or persons addressed" as in, "It's four kilometers away, eh, so I have to go by bike". In that case, eh? is used to confirm the attention of the listener and to invite a supportive noise such as "Mm" or "Oh" or "Okay". This usage may be paraphrased as "I'm checking to see that you're [listening/following/in agreement] so I can continue". Grammatically, this usage constitutes an interjection; functionally, it is an implicit request for backchannel communication.

"Eh" can also be added to the end of a declarative sentence to turn it into a question seeking agreement. For example: "The weather is nice." becomes "The weather is nice, eh?". This same phrase could also be taken as "The weather is nice, don't you agree?". In this usage, it is similar to Scots "eh?", English "innit?", Portuguese "né?", Dutch "hè?", Japanese "ne?", Mandarin "bā" or French "hein?" (which differs from the French usage of "n'est-ce pas?" ("Is it not?") in that it does not use a (technically double or emphatic) negative).
 
The usage of "eh" in Canada is occasionally mocked in the United States, where some view its use as a stereotypical Canadianism. Such stereotypes have been reinforced in popular culture, and were famously lampooned in South Park: Bigger, Longer and Uncut. Singer Don Freed in his song "Saskatchewan" declares "What is this 'Eh?'-nonsense? I wouldn't speak like that if I were paid to". There are many merchandise items on the market today that use this phrase, such as T-shirts and coffee mugs.

It is often joked about by Canadians and Yoopers as well, and is sometimes even a part of the national or regional identity.

New Zealand

While not as commonly lampooned as the Canadian "eh", there are few features that are more eagerly recognized by New Zealanders as a marker of their identity than the tag particle "eh". This commonly used and referenced feature of New Zealand English (NZE) is one of great controversy to many communication scholars as it is both a mark of cultural identity and simultaneously a means to parody those of a lower socioeconomic status. The use of "eh" in New Zealand is very common among all demographics, although initially it was frequently linked with two main groups of people, the first being young, working-class, suburban Pakeha women and the second being working-class Maori men. The Pakeha are New Zealanders of British or European descent and Maori are indigenous Polynesians.

A 1994 study by communications scholar Miriam Meyerhoff sought to examine the function of "eh" in New Zealand culture. She hypothesized that "eh" did not function as a clarification device as frequently believed, but instead served as a means of establishing solidarity between individuals of similar ethnic descent. In her research, Meyerhoff analyzed conversations between an interviewer and an interviewee of either Pakeha or Maori descent and calculated the frequency of "eh" in the conversation. In order to yield the most natural speech, Meyerhoff instructed the interviewers to introduce themselves as a "friend of a friend", to their respective interviewees. Her results showed Maori men as the most frequent users of "eh" in their interviews. As Maori are typically of a lower socio-economic status, Meyerhoff proposed that "eh" functioned as a verbal cue that one reciprocated by another individual signified both shared identity and mutual acceptance. Therefore, in the context of Meyerhoff's research, "eh" can be equated as a device to establish and maintain a group identity. This phenomenon sheds light on the continuous scholarly debate questioning if language determines culture or culture determines language.

England, Scotland and Ireland
The usage of the word is widespread throughout much of the UK, particularly in  Eastern Scotland, the north of England, Northern Ireland, Wales. It is normally used to mean "what?". In Scotland, mainly around the Tayside region, "eh" is also used as a shortened term for "yes". For example, "Are you going to the Disco?" "Eh". In Aberdeen and the wider Doric Scots speaking area of Grampian, "eh" is often used to end a sentence, as a continuation or sometimes, inflection is added and it's used as a confirmation, or with different inflection, a question. For example, "I was walking home eh and I saw a badger eh", "It was a big car eh" or "We're going to the co-op eh?".

Elsewhere

"Eh?" used to solicit agreement or confirmation is also heard regularly amongst speakers in Australia, Trinidad and Tobago and the United Kingdom (where it is sometimes spelled "ay" on the assumption that "eh" would rhyme with "heh" or "meh"). In the Caribbean island of Barbados the word "nuh" acts similarly, as does "noh" in Surinamese Dutch and Sranantongo. The usage in New Zealand is similar, and is more common in the North Island. It is also heard in the United States, especially Minnesota, Wisconsin, the Upper Peninsula of Michigan (although the Scandinavian-based Yooperism "ya" is more common), Oklahoma, and the New England region. In New England and Oklahoma, it is also used as a general exclamation as in Scotland and the Channel Islands of Jersey and Guernsey.
It is occasionally used to express indifference, in a similar way to "meh".

Since usage of the word "eh" is not as common in the United States as it is in Canada, it is often used by Americans, and indeed Canadians themselves, to parody Canadian English.

The equivalent in South African English is "hey". This usage is also common in Western Canada. 

"Eh" is also used in Guernsey English and Jersey English.

"Eh" is very common in the English spoken in the Seychelles.

In Singapore, the use of medium Singlish often includes "eh" as an interjection, but it is not as popularly used as "lah". An example of a sentence that uses "eh" is "Dis guy Singlish damn good eh", meaning "this guy's Singlish is very good".

Similar to Singapore, Malaysia also uses "eh" in Manglish as an interjection. It is also used as an exclamation to express surprise, depending on the length & context of the "eh". It also depends how one sounds uses it as a short "eh" can be a sarcastic shock or a genuine one. Sometimes it can be used as the equivalent as "Oi" when the speaker is being angry to the listener such as "Eh, hello!?" or "Eh, can you not!?". A long "eeeh" can be a disgusted shock, annoyance, or greater surprise. The "eh" usage here is similar to the Japanese usage. It is used by all Malaysians regardless of what language they are using.

Similar terms in other languages 
Hè ("heh" ) (not to be confused with hé ("hey" ), an informal greeting and (potentially rude) way of getting someone's attention is an informal yet very common Dutch interjection that can be used as a brief exclamation to indicate confusion or surprise ("huh?"), in a prolonged manner when disappointed or annoyed ("aww"), or at the end of any sentence to form a tag question. The third usage is arguably the most popular. It very closely compares with "Eh" in Canadian English. In the regional dialects of Zealand and West Flanders, the corresponding and frequently used interjection "hé", is in fact pronounced the same as in English (note that the equivalent of Dutch [h] is silent in Zealandic and West Flemish).
Japanese Hé? is a common exclamation in Japanese and is used to express surprise. It is also used when the listener did not fully understand or hear what the speaker said. It can be lengthened to show greater surprise (e.g. Heeeeee?!). Ne and naa are extremely similar to the Canadian eh, being statement ending particles which solicit or assume agreement, confirmation, or comprehension on the part of the listener.
Portuguese né?, a contraction of não é? meaning "isn't it?", is used to turn a statement in to a question, even if no answer is expected, for emphasis or other objectives. 
Hein is used in French and in Portuguese in much the same way as in English.
Hain is used in Mauritian Creole and it can express a variety of ideas. It is generally used in context of a conversation and is generally interpreted very quickly.
Gell/gelle or oder, wa, wat or wahr ("true" or "correct") or nä/ne/net (from nicht, "not") are used in (very) colloquial German to express a positive interrogative at the end of a sentence, much as Eh is used in Canadian English. Statements expressed in Standard German are more commonly phrased in negative terms and outside of colloquial usage the ending interrogative is often nicht wahr, which invites a response of stimmt ("agreed", literally "that's right").
Nietwaar is used in Dutch in the same way as nicht wahr is in German.
Spanish "¿No?", literally translated to English as "no", is often put at the end of a statement to change it into a question and give emphasis. I.e. "Hace buen tiempo, ¿no?" (The weather is nice, isn't it?) Eh is also used as well to emphasize, as in "¡Te vas a caer de la silla, eh!" (You're going to fall, if you keep doing that!) Che also has a similar function. 
In Catalan, "eh?" is also commonly used.
Swiss German "Oder" which means "or" in English is commonly used interrogatively as "... or what?" and "gäll/gell" at the end of sentences in German-speaking Switzerland, especially in the Zurich area. It is used more as a matter of conversational convention than for its meaning. The expression "ni" is used in highest allemanic speaking parts, and is used similarly to "net" in German. The term Äh is also used, which is pronounced similarly to eh in English and has the same meaning.
Azerbaijani "", "", """, "" are commonly used as "huh?". Alternatively, "" ("yes?"), and "" ("is it correct?") can be used as "isn't it?".
Pakistani Urdu "ہیں؟" used as "What? say it again".
Egyptian Arabic "ايه؟" as "What? say it again". It could also mean "What's wrong?" either in a concerned manner or a more aggressive one, depending on the tone used to pose the question. Besides, it could refer to an exclamation.
Levantine Arabic "ايش" or "شو" (Esh, Shoo) as "What?".
Gulf region Arabic "وشو" (wisho) as "What?".
Regional Italian "Neh" is used in regional Northern Italian as spoken in Piedmont, Western Lombardy (Northwestern Italy), and the Ticino (Southern Switzerland), with the meaning of "isn't it true?". It comes from the expression in the local languages (Piedmontese and Lombard) "N'è (mia/pa) vera?", which means, once again, "isn't it true?"

References

Canadian culture
Canadian English
New Zealand culture
Interjections
Interrogative words and phrases
English words
Canadiana